The 2mm Pinfire is a pistol cartridge for small 2 mm-chambered pinfire guns.

Many rifles, single-shot pistols and revolvers are made in limited quantities as collectors' items (one notable one is the Xythos revolver). Pistols are generally around 1.5 inches in length, and discharge a small lead bullet at a speed of around 500 feet per second. Despite the relatively high velocity, its kinetic energy is less than 1 Joule due to the light projectile.

See also 
 2 mm caliber

References

Pistols